Deindustrialization is a process of social and economic change caused by the removal or reduction of industrial capacity or activity in a country or region, especially of heavy industry or manufacturing industry. 

There are different interpretations of what deindustrialization is.  Many associate American deindustrialization with the mass closing of automaker plants in the now so-called Rust Belt between 1980 and 1990. The US Federal Reserve raised interest and exchange rates beginning in 1979, and continuing until 1984, which automatically caused import prices to fall. Japan was rapidly expanding productivity during this time, and this decimated the US machine tool sector.  A second wave of deindustrialization occurred between 2001 and 2009, culminating in the automaker bailout of GM and Chrysler.

Research has pointed to investment in patents rather than in new capital equipment as a contributing factor. At a more fundamental level, Cairncross and Lever offer four possible definitions of deindustrialization:
 A straightforward long-term decline in the output of manufactured goods or in employment in the manufacturing sector. 
 A shift from manufacturing to the service sectors, so that manufacturing has a lower share of total employment. Such a shift may occur even if manufacturing employment is growing in absolute terms
 That manufactured goods comprise a declining share of external trade, so that there is a progressive failure to achieve a sufficient surplus of exports over imports to maintain an economy in external balance
 A continuing state of balance of trade deficit (as described in the third definition above) that accumulates to the extent that a country or region is unable to pay for necessary imports to sustain further production of goods, thus initiating a further downward spiral of economic decline.

Explanations

Theories that predict or explain deindustrialization have a long intellectual lineage. Rowthorn argues that Marx's theory of declining (industrial) profit may be regarded as one of the earliest. This theory argues that technological innovation enables more efficient means of production, resulting in increased physical productivity, i.e., a greater output of use value per unit of capital invested. In parallel, however, technological innovations replace people with machinery, and the organic composition of capital increases. Assuming only labor can produce new additional value, this greater physical output embodies a smaller value and surplus value. The average rate of industrial profit therefore declines in the longer term.

Rowthorn and Wells distinguish between deindustrialization explanations that see it as a positive process of, for example, maturity of the economy, and those that associate deindustrialization with negative factors like bad economic performance. They suggest deindustrialization may be both an effect and a cause of poor economic performance.

Pitelis and Antonakis suggest that, to the extent that manufacturing is characterized by higher productivity, this leads, all other things being equal, to a reduction in relative cost of manufacturing products, thus a reduction in the relative share of manufacturing (provided manufacturing and services are characterized by relatively inelastic demand). Moreover, to the extent that manufacturing firms downsize through, e.g., outsourcing, contracting out, etc., this reduces manufacturing share without negatively influencing the economy. Indeed, it potentially has positive effects, provided such actions increase firm productivity and performance.

George Reisman identified inflation as a contributor to deindustrialization. In his analysis, the process of fiat money inflation distorts the economic calculations necessary to operate capital-intensive manufacturing enterprises, and makes the investments necessary for sustaining the operations of such enterprises unprofitable.

Institutional arrangements have also contributed to deindustrialization such as economic restructuring. With breakthroughs in transportation, communication and information technology, a globalized economy that encouraged foreign direct investment, capital mobility and labor migration, and new economic theory's emphasis on specialized factor endowments, manufacturing moved to lower-cost sites and in its place service sector and financial agglomerations concentrated in urban areas.

The term deindustrialization crisis has been used to describe the decline of labor-intensive industry in a number of countries and flight of jobs away from cities. One example is labor-intensive manufacturing. After free-trade agreements were instituted with less developed nations in the 1980s and 1990s, labor-intensive manufacturers relocated production facilities to third world countries with much lower wages and lower standards. In addition, technological inventions that required less manual labor, such as industrial robots, eliminated many manufacturing jobs.

See also
 Center for Labor and Community Research
 Degrowth
 Deindustrialisation by country
 Jobless recovery
 Reindustrialization
 Post-industrial society
 Urban decay
 Industrial Revolution
 Industrialization
 Great Divergence
 Textile manufacture during the British Industrial Revolution
 The End of Work
 Rust Belt
 Dutch disease
 Mechanization
 Newly industrialized country
 Brownfield land

References

Further reading
 

Boulhol, H (2004) 'What is the impact of international trade on deindustrialization in OECD countries?' Flash No.2004-206 Paris, CDC IXIS Capital Markets 
 

 Byrne,  David. "Deindustrialization and Dispossession: An Examination of Social Division in the Industrial City," Sociology 29#1 (1995): 95– 115.
  in: 
 Cowie, J., Heathcott, J. and Bluestone, B. Beyond the Ruins: The Meanings of Deindustrialization Cornell University Press, 2003.
 Central Intelligence Agency. 2008. The CIA World Factbook
 
 Fuchs, V R (1968) The Service Economy New York, National Bureau of Economic Research
  

  On US and Canada.
 Koistinen, David. Confronting Decline: The Political Economy of Deindustrialization in Twentieth-Century New England. (University Press of Florida, 2013)
 Koistinen, David.  "Business and Regional Economic Decline: The Political Economy of Deindustrialization in Twentieth-Century New England"  Business and economic history online (2014) #12 
Krugman, Paul. "Domestic Distortions and the Deindustrialization Hypothesis." NBER Working Paper 5473, NBER & Stanford University, March 1996.
Kucera, D. and Milberg, W (2003) "Deindustrialization and Changes in Manufacturing Trade: Factor Content Calculations for 1978–1995." Review of World Economics 2003, Vol.139(4).

 Linkon, Sherry Lee and John Russo. Steeltown USA: Work and Memory in Youngstown (UP of Kansas, 2002).
 

 
 
 
 
 
 
  Pdf.
 
  Pdf.
  Pdf.
Sachs, J D and Shatz, H J (1995) 'Trade and Jobs in US Manufacturing' Brookings Papers on Economic Activity No. 1
 
Vicino, Thomas, J. Transforming Race and Class in Suburbia: Decline in Metropolitan Baltimore. New York: Palgrave Macmillan, 2008.

Historiography 
 
 Strangleman, Tim, James Rhodes, and Sherry Linkon, "Introduction to crumbling cultures: Deindustrialization, class, and memory." International Labor and Working-Class History 84#1 (2013): 7–22. online

External links

"The Qualitative Shift in European Integration: Towards Permanent Wage Pressures and a 'Latin-Americanization' of Europe?", Erik S. Reinert
Deindustrialization in Sub-Saharan Africa: Myth or Crisis?

Deindustrialization
Economic problems
Urban decay
Services (economics)
Economic development
Industrial history